Elizaveta Koteneva (born January 9, 2004, in Belgorod, Russia) is a Russian group rhythmic gymnast. She is the 2019 World Junior Group All-Around, Team, 5 Hoops and 5 Ribbons champion and the 2019 European Junior Group All-Around, Team, 5 Hoops and 5 Ribbons champion.

Career

Junior 
Elizaveta was born in Belgorod on January 9, 2004. She began training in rhythmic gymnastics at age 5. In 2017, she was invited to train with junior national team in Moscow. She was a member of Russian Group that competed at the 2019 World Junior Championships in Moscow, Russia taking the gold medal scoring a total of (49.550) ahead of Italy (45.100) and Belarus (43.100) in the all-around competition. They also won gold medals in team competition and in both apparatus finals.

References

External links 
 

Russian rhythmic gymnasts
2004 births
Living people
Medalists at the Junior World Rhythmic Gymnastics Championships
People from Belgorod
Sportspeople from Belgorod Oblast
21st-century Russian women